Doctor of Sciences (abbreviated д-р наук or д. н.; ;) is a higher doctoral degree in the Russian Empire, Soviet Union and many post-Soviet countries, which may be earned after the Candidate of Sciences.

History
The "Doctor of Sciences" degree was introduced in the Russian Empire in 1819 and abolished in 1917. Later it was revived in the USSR on January 13, 1934, by a decision of the Council of People's Commissars of the USSR. By the same decision, a lower degree, "Candidate of Sciences" (kandidat nauk), roughly the Russian equivalent to the research doctorate in other countries, was first introduced. This system was generally adopted by the USSR/Russia and many post-Soviet/Eastern bloc states, including Bulgaria, Belarus, former Czechoslovakia, Poland (since abolished), and Ukraine.

But note that the former Yugoslav degree "Doktor nauka" / "Доктор наука" / "Doktor znanosti", still awarded by Bosnia Herzegovina, Croatia, Montenegro, North Macedonia, Serbia, and Slovenia follows the Bologna Process and is therefore equivalent to either a PhD, or to a higher doctorate, depending on the institution awarding the degree.

Admission
Doctor of Sciences degrees are conferred by a national government agency called the Higher Attestation Commission (Vysshaya attestatsionnaya komissiya, VAK) on the solicitation by the specialized dissertation committee before which the candidate has defended her or his dissertation. Such committees are created in academic institutions with established research record and are accredited by VAK. The total number of committee members is typically about 20, all holding the Doctor of Sciences degree. The area of research specialization of at least five committee members must match the profile of the materials submitted by the doctoral candidate for the consideration. The candidate must conduct independent research. Therefore, no academic supervisor is required; moreover, typically the candidate is an established scholar him/herself, supervising a few Ph.D. students while working towards his or her Doctor of Sciences dissertation. However, it is normal practice when an experienced consultant is appointed to help the scholar with identifying the research problem and finding the approach to solving it; yet this is not technically regarded a supervision.

The procedures of conferring of both Kandidat and Doktor academic degrees are more formal and different from conferring a Ph.D. degree in Western universities. In particular, for the Doktor, the academic institution, where the scholar is affiliated as a doctoral candidate, must conduct a preliminary review of the research results and personal contribution made by the candidate and, depending on findings, elect whether to render formal support or not. By definition, this highly prestigious degree can be conferred only for a significant contribution to science and/or technology based on a public defense of a thesis, monograph, or (in rare cases) of a set of outstanding publications in peer-reviewed journals. The defense must be held at the session of a Specialized Dissertation Committee accredited by VAK. Prior to the defense, three referees holding Doctor of Sciences degrees themselves (the so-called "official opponents") must submit their written motivated assessments of the thesis. One more similar assessment is to be provided by some university or academic institution, working in the same field of science or technology, and in addition several other reviewers must mail their conclusions made based on a thesis summary (usually a 32-page brochure in natural sciences and 48 pages in social sciences).

In the former USSR, this degree is considered a sufficient credential for tenured full professorship at any institution of higher education. Unless an academic holds a Doctor of Sciences, she or he can make it to a full professor only through 15 years or more of outstanding teaching service on the university level. At least one published and widely accepted textbook and the degree of Kandidat Nauk are required in the latter case, anyway. A Doctor of Sciences degree holder can become a tenured full professor after just one year of teaching experience in a non-tenured faculty position. A degree of Doctor of Sciences also enables its holders to claim an academic rank of a professor awarded by VAK or a new rank of a "Professor of the Russian Academy of Sciences" established in 2015.

The Doctor of Sciences thus has no academic equivalent in North America, as it is a post-doctoral degree.

The German Habilitation and, to some extent, the French habilitation à diriger des recherches (HDR) are comparable to it, as are the British higher doctorates (e.g. Doctor of Science), although the last-mentioned are not required for career advancement. On the average, only 10 per cent of Kandidats eventually earn a Doktor degree. Although some exceptionally talented researchers in mathematics do earn Doctor of Sciences in their late 20s, the average age of the scholars reaching Doktor in most disciplines is about 50; this implicitly indicates the amount of contribution that must be made.

According to the Ministry of Education and Science of the Russian Federation, "In countries with a two-tier system of doctoral degrees, the degree of Doctor Nauk should be considered for recognition at the level of the second doctoral degree. In countries with only one doctoral degree, the degree of Doctor Nauk should be considered for recognition as equivalent to this degree."

According to guidelines published by the Russian Academy of Sciences:
 д. арх. – Doctor of Sciences in Architecture
 д. б. н. – Doctor of Sciences in Biological Sciences
 д. вет. н. – Doctor of Sciences in Veterinary Sciences
 д. воен. н. – Doctor of Sciences in Military Sciences
 д. г. н. – Doctor of Sciences in Geographical Sciences
 д. г.-м. н. – Doctor of Sciences in Geological and Mineralogical Sciences
 д. и. н. – Doctor of Sciences in Historical Sciences
 д. иск. – Doctor of Sciences in Study of Art
 д. м. н. – Doctor of Sciences in Medical Sciences
 д. п. н. – Doctor of Sciences in Psychological Sciences
 д. пед. н. – Doctor of Sciences in Pedagogical Sciences
 д. полит. н. – Doctor of Sciences in Political Sciences
 д. с.-х. н. – Doctor of Sciences in Agricultural Sciences
 д. социол. н. – Doctor of Sciences in Sociological Sciences
 д. т. н. – Doctor of Sciences in Technical Sciences
 д. теол. н. – Doctor of Sciences in Religious Sciences 
 д. ф. н. – Doctor of Sciences in Philological Sciences
 д. фарм. н. – Doctor of Sciences in Pharmaceutics
 д. ф.-м. н. – Doctor of Sciences in Physical and Mathematical Sciences
 д. филос. н. – Doctor of Sciences in Philosophical Sciences
 д. х. н.  – Doctor of Sciences in Chemical Sciences
 д. э. н. – Doctor of Sciences in Economics
 д. ю. н. – Doctor of Sciences in Jurisprudence

According to the International Standard Classification of Education, for purposes of international educational statistics:
 D.Sc.; D.Phil. to Doctor of Sciences in Philosophy,
 D.Lit.; Dr.Litt. to Doctor of Sciences in Literature, 
 D.Sc.; Dr.Nat.Sci. to Doctor of Sciences of Natural Science,
 LL.D.; D.Sci.Jus. to Doctor of Sciences of Legal Science.

See also
 Academic degree
 Doctor of Medicine
 Education in Russia
 Habilitation

References

Doctoral degrees
Education in Russia
Education in the Soviet Union